eBPF (often aliased BPF) is a technology that can run sandboxed programs in a privileged context such as the operating system kernel. It is used to safely and efficiently extend the capabilities of the kernel at runtime without requiring to change kernel source code or load kernel modules. Safety is provided through an in-kernel verifier which performs static code analysis and rejects programs which crash, hang or otherwise interfere with the kernel negatively. Loaded programs which passed the verifier are either interpreted or in-kernel JIT compiled for native execution performance. The execution model is event-driven and with few exceptions run-to-completion, meaning, programs can be attached to various hook points in the operating system kernel and are run upon triggering of an event. eBPF use cases include (but are not limited to) networking such as XDP, tracing and security subsystems. Given eBPF's efficiency and flexibility opened up new possibilities to solve production issues, Brendan Gregg famously coined eBPF as "superpowers for Linux". Linus Torvalds expressed that "BPF has actually been really useful, and the real power of it is how it allows people to do specialized code that isn't enabled until asked for". Due to its success in Linux, the eBPF runtime has been ported to other operating systems such as Windows.

History

Evolution from classic BPF 

eBPF was built on top of the Berkeley Packet Filter (cBPF). At the lowest level, it introduced the use of ten 64-bit registers (instead of two 32-bit long registers for cBPF), different jump semantics, a call instruction and corresponding register passing convention, new instructions, and a different encoding for these instructions. A number of additional features were subsequently added. The evolution of eBPF took many years and a large community of contributors, and is still ongoing. The table below summarizes some of the most significant milestones of this evolution:

Adoption 
eBPF has been adopted by a number of large-scale production users, for example:

 Meta uses eBPF through their Katran layer 4 load-balancer for all traffic going to facebook.com
 Google uses eBPF in GKE, developed and uses BPF LSM to replace audit and it uses eBPF for networking
 Cloudflare uses eBPF for load-balancing and DDoS protection and security enforcement
 Netflix uses eBPF for fleet-wide network observability and performance diagnosis
 Dropbox uses eBPF through Katran for layer 4 load-balancing
 Android uses eBPF for NAT46 and traffic monitoring
 Alibaba uses eBPF for Kubernetes Pod load-balancing
 Datadog uses eBPF for Kubernetes Pod networking and security enforcement
 Trip.com uses eBPF for Kubernetes Pod networking
 Microsoft ported eBPF and XDP to Windows
 Seznam uses eBPF through Cilium for layer 4 load-balancing
 CapitalOne uses eBPF for Kubernetes Pod networking
 Apple uses eBPF for Kubernetes Pod security
 Sky uses eBPF for Kubernetes Pod networking
 Walmart uses eBPF for layer 4 load-balancing
 Huawei uses eBPF through their DIGLIM secure boot system
 Ikea uses eBPF for Kubernetes Pod networking

Logo 
The bee is the official logo for eBPF. At the first eBPF Summit there was a vote taken and the bee mascot was named "eBee". The logo has originally been created by Vadim Shchekoldin. Earlier unofficial eBPF mascots have existed in the past, but haven't seen widespread adoption.

Naming 
There has been controversy around the naming of eBPF. The alias eBPF is often interchangeably used with BPF, for example by the Linux kernel community. eBPF and BPF is referred to as a technology name like LLVM. eBPF evolved from the Berkeley Packet Filter as an extended version, but its use case outgrew networking, and today eBPF as a pseudo-acronym is preferred.

eBPF Foundation 
The eBPF Foundation was created in August 2021 with the goal to expand the contributions being made to extend the powerful capabilities of eBPF and grow beyond Linux. Founding members include Meta, Google, Isovalent, Microsoft and Netflix. The purpose is to raise, budget and spend funds in support of various open source, open data and/or open standards projects relating to eBPF technologies to further drive the growth and adoption of the eBPF ecosystem. Since inception, Red Hat, Huawei, Crowdstrike, Tigera, DaoCloud, Datoms, FutureWei also joined.

Steering committee 
With the creation of the eBPF Foundation, an eBPF steering committee (BSC) was established in order to take care of the technical direction and vision of eBPF. Tasks include the collaboration among projects, defining the minimal requirements of eBPF runtimes, overseeing community events, maintaining eBPF technical project lifecycle procedures, and communicating on behalf of the eBPF community.

Active members include:
 Alexei Starovoitov, Meta
 Andrii Nakryiko, Meta
 Brendan Gregg, Intel
 Daniel Borkmann, Isovalent
 Dave Thaler, Microsoft
 Joe Stringer, Isovalent
 KP Singh, Google
 Lorenz Bauer, formerly Cloudflare

There are currently no emeritus members.

eBPF standardization 
Although eBPF is supported, to various degrees, on multiple platforms, there is no standard specification (as of January 2023) to formally define its components. However, there is currently some work in progress to define and publish a standard for the instruction set, under the auspices of the eBPF Foundation.

Security concerns 
Due to the ease of programmability, eBPF has been used as a tool for implementing microarchitectural timing side-channel attacks such as Spectre against vulnerable microprocessors. While unprivileged eBPF implemented mitigations against transient execution attacks, unprivileged use has ultimately been disabled by the kernel community by default to protect from use against future hardware vulnerabilities.

Conferences 
The eBPF community organises a number of technical workshops and conferences to discuss ongoing research, development efforts, and use cases around eBPF. They can broadly be categorised into user-focused conferences and more developer-focused conferences.

User-focused conferences:

 eBPF Summit, a user conference around eBPF production users and projects building upon eBPF
 Cloud Native eBPF Day, a CNCF event co-located with KubeCon for the cloud native community

Developer-focused conferences:

 LSF/MM/BPF workshop, an annual technical workshop for the BPF Linux kernel community
 BPF track at Linux Plumbers conference, a technical track for the BPF Linux kernel community and surrounding user space libraries and tooling

See also 
 Express Data Path

References

Further reading

External links 
 eBPF.io - Introduction, tutorials & eBPF community resources
 eBPF.foundation - Linux Foundation's eBPF Foundation site

Software